Cragia quadrinotata is a moth of the subfamily Arctiinae. It was described by Francis Walker in 1864. It is found in Kenya, Rwanda, South Africa and Uganda.

References

9984395701
Lithosiini
Moths of Africa